Gaziantep Oğuzeli International Airport  is a public airport in Gaziantep, Turkey. Inaugurated in 1976, it is 20 km from the city. Gaziantep Airport was extended with construction started in 1998, and achieved the international airport status in 2006. The passenger terminal covers an area of 5.799 m2 and has a parking lot for 400 cars.

Following the 2023 Turkey–Syria earthquake, Gaziantep became a major hub for humanitarian aid.

Airlines and destinations
The following airlines operate regular scheduled and charter flights at Oğuzeli Airport:

Statistics

References

 https://www.dhmi.gov.tr/sayfalar/istatistik.aspx

Airports in Turkey
Buildings and structures in Gaziantep Province
Transport in Gaziantep Province